Ah! My Goddess: Flights of Fancy, known in Japan as Ah! My Goddess: Everyone Has Wings (Sorezore no Tsubasa) is an anime television series directed by Hiroaki Gōda, animated by Anime International Company, and produced by Tokyo Broadcasting System (TBS). The episodes of the series are based on the manga series Oh My Goddess!, written and illustrated by Kōsuke Fujishima. Like its predecessor, the anime does not follow the manga chronologically. The plot covers adventures of Keiichi Morisato and Belldandy in the aftermath of the Lord of Terror fiasco.

It began broadcasting on TBS on April 6, 2006, and concluded its run on September 14, 2006, picking up the story from where the series left off in season one. Season two concluded with episode twenty-two, although the Japanese and North American DVD releases include episodes twenty-three and twenty-four. It was released to DVD in Japan between July 2006 and February 2007 by Bandai Visual. Media Blasters, who released the first season, passed up on this season and it was licensed to ADV Films instead for $516,000 The English dub was produced by NYAV Post, who had produced the dub for the first season. ADV Films released the season on six DVD compilations, each containing four episodes, between May and March 2007. The rights were later transferred to Funimation, who released a boxed set on November 25, 2007.

Three pieces of theme music were used throughout the series. The opening theme, titled , was performed by Yoko Ishida. Ishida also performed the first ending theme . The second ending theme, starting from episode 12 onwards is  performed by Jyukai.


Episode list

References

External links
 

2006 Japanese television seasons
Oh My Goddess!
Season 2